The men's high jump event at the 1996 World Junior Championships in Athletics was held in Sydney, Australia, at International Athletic Centre on 22 and 24 August.

Medalists

Results

Final
24 August

Qualifications
22 Aug

Group A

Group B

Participation
According to an unofficial count, 34 athletes from 26 countries participated in the event.

References

High jump
High jump at the World Athletics U20 Championships